Fredon Township is a township in Sussex County, New Jersey, United States. As of the 2020 United States census, the township's population was 3,235, a decrease of 202 over the previous decade. As of the 2010 United States Census, the township's population was 3,437, reflecting an increase of 577 (+20.2%) from the 2,860 counted in the 2000 Census, which had in turn increased by 97 (+3.5%) from the 2,763 counted in the 1990 Census.

In 1800, Isaac V. Coursen named the Stillwater Township area "Coursen's Corners" after establishing a post office in his store, the Coursen House, but changed the name to Fredon Village before his death in 1855. Stillwater Township's Bicentennial Committee obtained information from the Postmaster General which "states that 'Fredon' is derived from the German word 'fredonia,' meaning place of freedom." Fredon Township was incorporated on February 24, 1904, from portions of Andover Township, Green Township, Hampton Township and Stillwater Township.

Geography
According to the United States Census Bureau, the township had a total area of 17.92 square miles (46.40 km2), including 17.64 square miles (45.69 km2) of land and 0.28 square miles (0.71 km2) of water (1.53%).

Unincorporated communities, localities and place names located partially or completely within the township include Hunts Pond, Muckshaw Pond and Stillwater.

Fredon Township borders the municipalities of Andover Township, Green Township, Hampton Township, Newton and Stillwater Township in Sussex County; and Frelinghuysen Township in Warren County

The New York, Susquehanna and Western Railway operated from 1872 until 1962 through the Paulinskill Valley, which runs along the border with Hampton and Stillwater Townships to the township's northwest, and was used to transport agricultural products to New York City. Today the right-of-way has been developed into the Paulinskill Valley Trail, a non-motorized multi-use trail that is part of the Kittatinny Valley State Park.

Demographics

Census 2010

The Census Bureau's 2006–2010 American Community Survey showed that (in 2010 inflation-adjusted dollars) median household income was $104,074 (with a margin of error of +/− $9,084) and the median family income was $110,000 (+/− $10,332). Males had a median income of $78,000 (+/− $7,722) versus $42,981 (+/− $6,474) for females. The per capita income for the borough was $40,761 (+/− $4,361). About none of families and 1.9% of the population were below the poverty line, including none of those under age 18 and 6.3% of those age 65 or over.

Census 2000
As of the 2000 United States Census there were 2,860 people, 982 households, and 818 families residing in the township.  The population density was 161.1 people per square mile (62.2/km2).  There were 1,019 housing units at an average density of 57.4 per square mile (22.2/km2).  The racial makeup of the township was 97.17% White, 0.52% African American, 0.24% Native American, 0.84% Asian, 0.56% from other races, and 0.66% from two or more races. Hispanic or Latino of any race were 2.17% of the population.

There were 982 households, out of which 39.0% had children under the age of 18 living with them, 75.5% were married couples living together, 6.3% had a female householder with no husband present, and 16.7% were non-families. 13.3% of all households were made up of individuals, and 5.6% had someone living alone who was 65 years of age or older.  The average household size was 2.89 and the average family size was 3.18.

In the township the population was spread out, with 26.6% under the age of 18, 5.2% from 18 to 24, 29.3% from 25 to 44, 29.5% from 45 to 64, and 9.3% who were 65 years of age or older.  The median age was 39 years. For every 100 females, there were 95.8 males.  For every 100 females age 18 and over, there were 95.4 males.

The median income for a household in the township was $75,710, and the median income for a family was $84,038. Males had a median income of $52,396 versus $34,205 for females. The per capita income for the township was $31,430.  About 0.7% of families and 2.2% of the population were below the poverty line, including 2.9% of those under age 18 and 3.4% of those age 65 or over.

Government

Local government 
Fredon Township is governed under the Township form of New Jersey municipal government, one of 141 municipalities (of the 564) statewide that use this form, the second-most commonly used form of government in the state. The Township Committee is comprised of five members, who are elected directly by the voters at-large in partisan elections to serve three-year terms of office on a staggered basis, with either one or two seats coming up for election each year as part of the November general election in a three-year cycle. At an annual reorganization meeting held during the first week of January, the Township Committee selects one of its members to serve as Mayor and another as Deputy Mayor.

, members of the Fredon Township Committee are Mayor John Flora (R, term on township committee ends December 31, 2023; term as mayor ends 2022), Glenn Dietz (R, 2023), Carl Lazzaro (R, 2022), Christopher Nichols (R, 2024) and George Plock (R, 2024).

In December 2015, the Township Committee appointed Keith Smith to fill the seat expiring in December 2016 that had been held by former mayor Carl F. Lazzaro until he resigned to run for and win a seat as a Sussex County Freeholder; Smith will serve on an interim basis until the November 2016 general election, when voters will select a candidate to serve the balance of the term of office.

Federal, state, and county representation 
Fredon Township is located in the 7th Congressional District and is part of New Jersey's 24th state legislative district.

 

Sussex County is governed by a Board of County Commissioners whose five members are elected at-large in partisan elections on a staggered basis, with either one or two seats coming up for election each year. At an annual reorganization meeting held in the beginning of January, the board selects a Commissioner Director and Deputy Director from among its members, with day-to-day supervision of the operation of the county delegated to a County Administrator. , Sussex County's Commissioners are 
Commissioner Director Anthony Fasano (R, Hopatcong, term as commissioner and as commissioner director ends December 31, 2022), 
Deputy Director Chris Carney (R, Frankford Township, term as commissioner ends 2024; term as deputy director ends 2022), 
Dawn Fantasia (R, Franklin, 2024), 
Jill Space (R, Wantage Township, 2022; appointed to serve an unexpired term) and 
Herbert Yardley (R, Stillwater Township, 2023). In May 2022, Jill Space was appointed to fill the seat expiring in December 2022 that had been held by Sylvia Petillo until she resigned from office.

Constitutional officers elected on a countywide basis are 
County Clerk Jeffrey M. Parrott (R, Wantage Township, 2026),
Sheriff Michael F. Strada (R, Hampton Township, 2022) and 
Surrogate Gary R. Chiusano (R, Frankford Township, 2023). The County Administrator is Gregory V. Poff II, whose appointment expires in 2025.

Politics
As of March 23, 2011, there were a total of 2,394 registered voters in Fredon Township, of which 316 (13.2% vs. 16.5% countywide) were registered as Democrats, 1,136 (47.5% vs. 39.3%) were registered as Republicans and 941 (39.3% vs. 44.1%) were registered as Unaffiliated. There was one voter registered to another party. Among the township's 2010 Census population, 69.7% (vs. 65.8% in Sussex County) were registered to vote, including 93.7% of those ages 18 and over (vs. 86.5% countywide).

In the 2012 presidential election, Republican Mitt Romney received 1,237 votes (65.6% vs. 59.4% countywide), ahead of Democrat Barack Obama with 610 votes (32.3% vs. 38.2%) and other candidates with 33 votes (1.7% vs. 2.1%), among the 1,887 ballots cast by the township's 2,478 registered voters, for a turnout of 76.2% (vs. 68.3% in Sussex County). In the 2008 presidential election, Republican John McCain received 1,269 votes (64.4% vs. 59.2% countywide), ahead of Democrat Barack Obama with 654 votes (33.2% vs. 38.7%) and other candidates with 40 votes (2.0% vs. 1.5%), among the 1,970 ballots cast by the township's 2,405 registered voters, for a turnout of 81.9% (vs. 76.9% in Sussex County). In the 2004 presidential election, Republican George W. Bush received 1,202 votes (67.5% vs. 63.9% countywide), ahead of Democrat John Kerry with 553 votes (31.1% vs. 34.4%) and other candidates with 21 votes (1.2% vs. 1.3%), among the 1,780 ballots cast by the township's 2,150 registered voters, for a turnout of 82.8% (vs. 77.7% in the whole county).

In the 2013 gubernatorial election, Republican Chris Christie received 76.9% of the vote (864 cast), ahead of Democrat Barbara Buono with 19.7% (221 votes), and other candidates with 3.4% (38 votes), among the 1,138 ballots cast by the township's 2,464 registered voters (15 ballots were spoiled), for a turnout of 46.2%. In the 2009 gubernatorial election, Republican Chris Christie received 911 votes (67.7% vs. 63.3% countywide), ahead of Democrat Jon Corzine with 297 votes (22.1% vs. 25.7%), Independent Chris Daggett with 120 votes (8.9% vs. 9.1%) and other candidates with 15 votes (1.1% vs. 1.3%), among the 1,346 ballots cast by the township's 2,370 registered voters, yielding a 56.8% turnout (vs. 52.3% in the county).

Education
Public school students are served by the Fredon Township School District for pre-kindergarten through sixth grade at Fredon Township School. As of the 2020–21 school year, the district, comprised of one school, had an enrollment of 178 students and 21.8 classroom teachers (on an FTE basis), for a student–teacher ratio of 8.2:1. Fredon School was awarded the National Blue Ribbon Award for Academic Excellence in November 2001, the highest level of recognition granted to an American school.

Students in seventh through twelfth grade for public school attend Kittatinny Regional High School located in Hampton Township, which serves students who reside in Fredon Township, Hampton Township, Sandyston Township, Stillwater Township and Walpack Township. The high school is located on a  campus in Hampton Township, about seven minutes outside of the county seat of Newton. As of the 2020–21 school year, the high school had an enrollment of 843 students and 91.5 classroom teachers (on an FTE basis), for a student–teacher ratio of 9.2:1. Kittatinny Regional High School was recognized as a National Blue Ribbon School of Excellence in 1997–1998.

Transportation

New Jersey Route 94 is the main highway serving Fredon Township. County Route 519 is the only other significant road traversing the township.

Notable people

People who were born in, residents of, or otherwise closely associated with Fredon Township include:
 Delicate Steve (stage name of Steve Marion), recording artist signed to David Byrne's Luaka Bop Records
 Uli Derickson (1944–2005), flight attendant best known for her role in helping protect 152 passengers and crew members during the June 14, 1985 hijacking of TWA Flight 847
 Charles Joseph Fletcher (1922–2011), inventor and the owner / CEO of Technology General Corporation who developed an early version of the hovercraft

References

External links

Fredon Township website
Fredon Township School District

Data for Fredon Township School District, National Center for Education Statistics
Kittatinny Regional High School

 
1904 establishments in New Jersey
Populated places established in 1904
Township form of New Jersey government
Townships in Sussex County, New Jersey